The 1989–90 Southwest Missouri State Bears basketball team represented Southwest Missouri State University in National Collegiate Athletic Association (NCAA) Division I men's basketball during the 1989–90 season. Playing in the Mid-Continent Conference and led by head coach Charlie Spoonhour, the Bears finished the season with a 22–7 overall record and won the Mid-Con regular season title. Southwest Missouri State lost to North Carolina in the opening round of the NCAA tournament.

Roster

Schedule and results

|-
!colspan=9 style=| Regular season

|-
!colspan=9 style=| Mid-Con tournament

|-
!colspan=10 style=| NCAA tournament

Awards and honors
Lee Campbell – Mid-Con Player of the Year

References

Missouri State Bears basketball seasons
Southwest Missouri State
Missouri State Bears Basketball Team
Missouri State Bears Basketball Team
Southwest Missouri State